Juan Camilo Saiz Ortegón (born 1 March 1992) is a Colombian professional footballer who plays as a defender for Independiente Medellín.

Club career
Envigado were Saiz's first club, he spent time in the team's youth system prior to making his professional debut in August 2009 against La Equidad in a 2–2 draw. After two further league appearances for Envigado, Saiz departed Colombian football on a temporary basis to join Argentine Primera División side Argentinos Juniors on loan. He returned to Envigado six months later without featuring. He went onto make thirty-three more appearances for Envigado. He scored the first goal of his career on 30 July 2014 in a Copa Colombia draw with Atlético Nacional.

Saiz completed a transfer to fellow Colombian top-flight team Independiente Medellín in July 2015. He eventually made his debut in December, coming on for the final minutes in the club's 1–0 league victory versus Atlético Nacional. Forty-five appearances followed in the next three seasons for Saiz. In August 2017, Saiz rejoined Argentinos Juniors on loan. He made his club debut on 24 September 2017 in a 1–1 draw against River Plate. Cerro Porteño of the Paraguayan Primera División secured a loan deal for Saiz in July 2018. He ended up remaining until June 2020, making thirty-one appearances.

On 22 August 2020, Saiz headed to Europe to join Cypriot First Division side Pafos on loan. He made his debut for the club on 28 August against Anorthosis Famagusta, prior to scoring his first goal in a 2–2 draw with Ethnikos Achna on 19 September.

International career
Saiz represented Colombia at U17 and U20 level. He played in seven matches for the U17s at the 2009 FIFA U-17 World Cup in Nigeria as the team finished fourth. He also featured seven times for the U20s at the 2011 South American U-20 Championship in Peru.

Career statistics
.

Honours
Independiente Medellín
Categoría Primera A: 2016 Apertura

References

External links

1992 births
Living people
People from Balcarce Partido
Colombian footballers
Colombia youth international footballers
Colombia under-20 international footballers
Association football defenders
Colombian expatriate footballers
Expatriate footballers in Argentina
Expatriate footballers in Paraguay
Expatriate footballers in Cyprus
Colombian expatriate sportspeople in Argentina
Colombian expatriate sportspeople in Paraguay
Colombian expatriate sportspeople in Cyprus
Categoría Primera A players
Argentine Primera División players
Cypriot First Division players
Envigado F.C. players
Argentinos Juniors footballers
Independiente Medellín footballers
Cerro Porteño players
Pafos FC players
People from Tolima Department